The 2020 North Carolina election for Attorney General was held on November 3, 2020, to elect the Attorney General of North Carolina, concurrently with the 2020 U.S. presidential election, as well as elections to the United States Senate and elections to the United States House of Representatives and various state and local elections.

Party primary elections were held on March 3, 2020.

Incumbent Democratic Attorney General Josh Stein, first elected in 2016, ran for re-election against Republican Forsyth County District Attorney Jim O'Neill. With a narrow margin separating Stein and O'Neill, the Associated Press was finally able to call Stein the winner on November 17, 2020 (two weeks after Election Day).

Democratic primary

Candidates

Declared
Josh Stein, incumbent attorney general

Republican primary

Candidates

Declared
Sam Hayes, general counsel for the North Carolina State Treasurer Dale Folwell
Christine Mumma, executive director of the North Carolina Center on Actual Innocence
Jim O'Neill, Forsyth County district attorney and candidate for North Carolina Attorney General in 2016

Results

General election

Predictions

Polling

Results

Notes

References

External links
 
 
  (State affiliate of the U.S. League of Women Voters)
 

Official campaign websites
 Jim O'Neill (R) for Attorney General
 Josh Stein (D) for Attorney General

Attorney General
North Carolina Attorney General elections
North Carolina